The grass Tuctoria mucronata, which is known by several common names including prickly spiralgrass, Solano grass, and Crampton's tuctoria, is a federally listed endangered plant species endemic to two counties in northern California.

Description
It is a small annual, with stems growing decumbent against the ground to a maximum length of 12 cm, and turning upward at the tips. The leaves are 2–4 cm long, and secrete a sticky, aromatic juice. In the spring, the grass bears a small inflorescence 1.5–6 cm long, with numerous crowded spikelets.

Ecology
Solano grass is a vernal pool plant. It is only found in these seasonally wet areas, a type of habitat which is endangered. This species is thought to have once grown in isolated parts the northern Sacramento-San Joaquin Delta, in areas which flooded during the wet season, but any former habitat there has been long since reclaimed for agriculture. Only a few individuals of the plant now exist, mostly in Yolo County. It was found during the 1990s at Jepson Prairie Preserve, an area dedicated to conserving vernal pool habitat, but it may no longer exist there.

Loss of critical habitat is the main cause of the near extinction of Solano grass. This loss is caused by land reclamation for development, recreation, and agricultural use, including for grazing animals, fertilizer runoff, and disturbance of the natural hydrology of the Central Valley. Invasive plants have also played a role in crowding out more delicate native grasses, such as Solano grass, Greene's tuctoria (Tuctoria greenei), Colusa grass (Neostapfia colusana), and several species of genus Orcuttia.

References

External links
Jepson Manual (TJM93) treatment of Tuctoria mucronata
The Nature Conservancy
UC Photos gallery − Tuctoria mucronata

Chloridoideae
Native grasses of California
Endemic flora of California
Bunchgrasses of North America
Natural history of the Central Valley (California)
Natural history of Solano County, California
Critically endangered flora of California